is a Japanese footballer who plays as a forward for Vissel Kobe in the J1 League, on loan from Portuguese club Portimonense.

Club career
On 10 September 2021, he signed a five-year contract with Portimonense in Portugal.

Career statistics

Club
.

Notes

References

External links

2001 births
People from Kishiwada, Osaka
Living people
Association football people from Osaka Prefecture
Japanese footballers
Association football forwards
Gamba Osaka players
Gamba Osaka U-23 players
Portimonense S.C. players
J1 League players
J3 League players
Japanese expatriate footballers
Expatriate footballers in Portugal
Japanese expatriate sportspeople in Portugal